Vandergriff is a surname. Notable people with the surname include:

Donald Vandergriff, United States Army officer and writer
Jerry Vandergriff (born  1942), American football player and coach
Tom Vandergriff (1926–2010), American politician